Transcription factor 20 is a protein that in humans is encoded by the TCF20 gene.

The protein encoded by this gene binds a platelet-derived growth factor-responsive element in the matrix metalloproteinase 3 (stromelysin 1) promoter. The protein localizes to the nucleus and displays DNA-binding and transactivation activities. It is thought to be a transcriptional coactivator, enhancing the activity of transcription factors such as JUN and SP1. Alternative splicing results in two transcript variants encoding different isoforms.

Interactions 

TCF20 has been shown to interact with RNF4.

References

Further reading